Rai Benjamin (born July 27, 1997) is an American professional hurdler and sprinter specializing in the 400 m and 400 m hurdles. He is the second fastest man in history in the 400 m hurdles with a personal best time of 46.17 s. He won a silver medal at his first Olympic Games in 2021 and at the World Championships in 2019 in the men's 400 m hurdles, and gold medals in the  relay at the same competitions.

In college Benjamin ran for the UCLA Bruins and then the USC Trojans, where in early 2018 he was part of the team that set the world best time in the indoor  relay with a time of 3:00.77. At the time, his relay split time of 44.35 s was the fastest ever recorded in an indoor race. In June of the same year he also helped set the NCAA record in the same event but outdoors, and ran what was at the time the second fastest 400 m hurdles race of all-time in 47.02 s.

Early life and career

Rai Benjamin, from Mount Vernon High School (New York), was the fastest 2015 prep time in the United States in the 400m hurdles with a time of 49.97, fastest 400 m indoor time in the country with a 46.59 and the third fastest outdoor time 46.19.

Benjamin won the 2015 New York Indoor State meet with a national leading time of 33.17 in the 300 meters. He was a three-time New York State Public High School Athletic Association champion in the 400m hurdles.

He was the 2015 New Balance 400 meters National Champion and the 2015 New Balance Outdoor 400-meter hurdles National Champion.

Just after completing his second year, he represented Antigua and Barbuda at the 2013 World Youth Championships.  Just after graduating, he won a silver medal in the 400 meters at the 2015 CARIFTA Games.

Benjamin wanted to run for the USA, since he was born in New York, but at the 2013 World Youth Championships in Athletics, he represented Antigua in the 400 m hurdles.

In 2017, the IAAF suspended all transfers of allegiance, meaning Benjamin could not represent the United States until transfers were reinstated in summer 2018. In October 2018, Benjamin's transfer request was approved, allowing him to represent the United States abroad and compete in USATF Championship events.

At the 2018 Meeting Areva in Paris, he ran 19.99 in the 200 meters to take .65 of a second off his previous personal best.  He became the 72nd person to break 20 seconds, in what is perhaps his third best event on the track.

At the 2019 Mt. SAC Relays, that year at El Camino College in Torrance, California, Benjamin joined his training partner and previous college teammate, Michael Norman running the 400 meters.  Benjamin ran his personal best of 44.31, the 50th best time in history behind Norman's 43.45, which turned out to be the fastest 400 run in the 2019 season and tied him as the 4th fastest of all time.

College career
Benjamin is a three-time NCAA Division I track champion. As a college student-athlete, Benjamin earned three Pac-12 conference titles, one Mountain Pacific Sports Federation title, and eight NCAA Division I All-America honors (five outdoor, three indoor).

Benjamin's All-America honors were for these accomplishments:

 2016 indoor, as part of a seventh-place team finish in the indoors distance medley relay, with a time of 9:34.9.
 2016 outdoor, for a sixth-place finish in the 400-meter hurdles in 49.82.
 2017 outdoor, for a second-place finish in the 400-meter hurdles in 48.33, and as part of a team finish of 39.89 in the 4x100m relay.
 2018 indoor, for a third-place finish in the 200m, and as part of a team that set a college indoor track record of 3:00.77 in the 4x400m relay.
 2018 outdoor, as part of a team that won the 4x400m relay in 2:59.00, and for a college record time of 47.02 in the 400m hurdles. His time equalled Edwin Moses's for the second fastest time in history.

Personal life
Benjamin is the son of West Indies international and Antiguan cricketer Winston Benjamin.

Statistics
Information from World Athletics profile unless otherwise noted.

Personal bests

International championship results

Circuit wins
Diamond League (400 m hurdles)
Rome: 2019
Stanford: 2019
Doha: 2021
World Indoor Tour (300 m)
Boston: 2019

National championship results

NCAA results from Track & Field Results Reporting System.

Seasonal bests

Notes

References

External links

 (USC)
 (UCLA)
Rai Benjamin bio at USC Trojans
Rai Benjamin bio at UCLA Bruins

Videos
Michael Norman and Rai Benjamin at Mt SAC Relays 2019 via MyStyle Records on YouTube
Michael Norman 19.84 Wins Men's 200m – IAAF Diamond League Paris 2018 via IAAF Diamond League on YouTube (Rai Benjamin 2nd in 19.99)

1997 births
Living people
American male hurdlers
American male sprinters
African-American male track and field athletes
Sportspeople from Mount Vernon, New York
Track and field athletes from New York (state)
United States collegiate record holders in athletics (track and field)
UCLA Bruins men's track and field athletes
USC Trojans men's track and field athletes
World Athletics Championships athletes for the United States
World Athletics Championships medalists
World Athletics Championships winners
USA Outdoor Track and Field Championships winners
Athletes (track and field) at the 2020 Summer Olympics
Medalists at the 2020 Summer Olympics
Olympic gold medalists for the United States in track and field
Olympic silver medalists for the United States in track and field
21st-century African-American sportspeople
Mount Vernon High School (New York) alumni